Welshampton and Lyneal is a civil parish in Shropshire, England.  It contains 40 listed buildings that are recorded in the National Heritage List for England.  Of these, one is listed at Grade II*, the middle of the three grades, and the others are at Grade II, the lowest grade.  The parish contains the villages of Welshampton, Lyneal and Colemere, and is otherwise rural.  The Llangollen Canal passes through the parish, and five bridges crossing it are listed.  Also in the parish is Oteley Park, the grounds of the demolished Oteley Hall, and a number of structures in the grounds are listed.  Most of the other listed buildings are houses, cottages, farmhouses and farm buildings, the earliest of which are timber framed.  Also listed are two churches, items in churchyards, a milestone, and a saw mill.


Key

Buildings

References

Citations

Sources

Lists of buildings and structures in Shropshire